Tempe Pigott (2 February 1869 – 6 October 1962) was an Australian silent and sound screen character actress. She was a stage actress in England and Australia, Canada and the United States for a number of years before entering motion pictures.

In 1907, she was a member of the Lillian Meyers Dramatic Company which toured Australia; for some years thereafter, she remained in Australia and made a name for herself in the theatre in plays such as Nobody's Daughter (1911), Oscar Wilde's A Woman of No Importance (1912), and Sir Arthur Wing Pinero's His House in Order (1914). She is given one credit for her role as Mrs. Hubbard in Douglas Murray's Broadway stage play, Perkins, which starred Ruth Chatterton, and ran for 23 performances at Henry Miller's Theatre in the fall of 1918. Her silent and sound film appearances were numerous. She is remembered mainly for playing the mother of John McTeague (Gibson Gowland) in Erich von Stroheim's Greed (1924) and the landlady Mrs. Hawkins in Dr. Jekyll and Mr. Hyde (1931).

She died at Motion Picture Country Hospital in Woodland Hills, California, USA.

Selected filmography

 The Great Impersonation (1921) - Mrs. Unthank
 The Masked Avenger (1922) - Aunt Phoebe Dyer
 Vanity Fair (1923) - Mrs. Sedley
 The Rustle of Silk (1923) - Mrs. De Breeze
 The Dawn of a Tomorrow (1924) - Ginney
 Greed (1924) - Mother McTeague
 The Narrow Street (1925) - Aunt Agnes
 Without Mercy (1925) - Madame Gordon
 The Lure of the Track (1925)
 The Black Pirate (1926) - Duenna
 The Midnight Kiss (1926) - Grandma Spencer
 Sunrise: A Song of Two Humans (1927) - Flower Seller (uncredited)
 Silk Stockings (1927) - Mrs. Gower
 Wallflowers (1928) - Mrs. Claybourne
 Road House (1928) - Grandma Grayson
 Seven Days Leave (1930) - Mrs. Haggerty
 Night Work (1930) - Flora (uncredited)
 Outward Bound (1930) - First Gossip (uncredited)
 Born to Love (1931) - Landlady (uncredited)
 Devotion (1931) - Tibby - The Cook (uncredited)
 Dr. Jekyll and Mr. Hyde (1931) - Mrs. Hawkins
 Murders in the Rue Morgue (1932) - Crone (uncredited)
 Almost Married (1932)
 American Madness (1932) - Mrs. Halligan (uncredited)
 If I Had a Million (1932) - Idylwood Resident (uncredited)
 Cavalcade (1933) - Mrs. Snapper
 Oliver Twist (1933) - Mrs. Corney
 Looking Forward (1933) - Woman Looking for Plumbing Department (uncredited)
 A Study in Scarlet (1933) - Mrs. Hudson (uncredited)
 Man of the Forest (1933) - Peg's Friend
 Doctor Bull (1933) - Grandma Banning
 If I Were Free (1933) - Mrs. Gill
 Miss Fane's Baby Is Stolen (1934) - Woman Praying In Church (uncredited)
 Long Lost Father (1934) - Mrs. Gamp - The Old Woman
 All Men Are Enemies (1934) - Tony's Housekeeper (uncredited)
 Of Human Bondage (1934) - Agnes Hollett (uncredited)
 One More River (1934) - Mrs. Purdy
 The Lemon Drop Kid (1934) - Old Lady (uncredited)
 Flirtation (1934) - Flower Woman (uncredited)
 Limehouse Blues (1934) - Maggie (uncredited)
 Vanessa: Her Love Story (1935) - Cake Seller at the Fair (uncredited)
 The Devil Is a Woman (1935) - Tuerta
 Bride of Frankenstein (1935) - Auntie Glutz (uncredited)
 Werewolf of London (1935) - Drunk Woman (uncredited)
 Becky Sharp (1935) - The Charwoman
 Calm Yourself (1935) - Anne 'Annie'
 A Feather in Her Hat (1935) - Katy (uncredited)
 I Found Stella Parish (1935) - Waiting Woman (uncredited)
 Kind Lady (1935) - Flower Woman (uncredited)
 A Tale of Two Cities (1935) - Old Hag (uncredited)
 The Story of Louis Pasteur (1936) - Woman (uncredited)
 Little Lord Fauntleroy (1936) - Mrs. Dibble
 Till We Meet Again (1936) - Old Woman (uncredited)
 The White Angel (1936) - Mrs. Waters, the Drunken Nurse
 Suzy (1936) - Old Woman Getting Police (uncredited)
 The Road Back (1937) - Old Woman (uncredited)
 Fools for Scandal (1938) - Bessie
 The Rage of Paris (1938) - Nicole's Landlady (uncredited)
 Confessions of a Nazi Spy (1939) - (uncredited)
 Boys' Reformatory (1939) - Mrs. Callahan
 Some Like It Hot (1939) - Flower Woman (uncredited)
 The Hunchback of Notre Dame (1939) - Madeleine (uncredited)
 The Earl of Chicago (1940) - Mrs. Oakes (uncredited)
 Waterloo Bridge (1940) - Cockney in Air-Raid Shelter (uncredited)
 Arise, My Love (1940) - Woman in Irish Pub (uncredited)
 Shining Victory (1941) - Miss Weatherby, a Patient (uncredited)
 One Foot in Heaven (1941) - Mrs. Dibble (uncredited)
 Now, Voyager (1942) - Mrs. Smith (uncredited)
 Jane Eyre (1943) - Fortune Teller (uncredited)
 The Hour Before the Dawn (1944) - Mrs. Saunders (uncredited)
 Kitty (1945) - Woman in Window (uncredited)
 Forever Amber (1947) - Midwife (uncredited)
 The Fan (1949) - Mrs. Rudge (uncredited)
 The Pilgrimage Play (1949) - (uncredited)
 Thunder on the Hill (1951) - Old Crone (uncredited) (final film role)

References

External links

1869 births
1962 deaths
Australian film actresses
Australian silent film actresses
20th-century Australian actresses